Year 1494 (MCDXCIV) was a common year starting on Wednesday (link will display the full calendar) of the Julian calendar.

Events 
 January–December 
 January 4 – The Cetinje Octoechos (Цетињски октоих, an Eastern Orthodox octoechos (liturgy), first tone), the first incunabulum written in the Serbian recension of Church Slavonic, and the first book printed in Cyrillic in Southeast Europe, is completed in Cetinje.
 January 25 – Alfonso II becomes King of Naples.
 May – Maximilian I, Holy Roman Emperor, recognises the pretender Perkin Warbeck as rightful King of England.
 May 5 – Christopher Columbus first sights Jamaica.
 May 7 – The infant Amda Seyon II succeeds his father Eskender as Emperor of Ethiopia.
 May 31 – First Battle of Acentejo: Natives of the island of Tenerife, known as Guanches, defeat the invading Spanish forces. 
 June 7 – Treaty of Tordesillas: Spain and Portugal divide the New World between themselves. 
 June 25 – The first hurricane ever observed by Europeans strikes the Spanish settlement of La Isabela, on Hispaniola.
 October 22 – Ludovico Sforza becomes Duke of Milan, and invites Charles VIII of France to invade Italy in support of his claim, beginning the Italian War of 1494–98.
 October 26 – Amda Seyon II is deposed and killed, and his uncle Na'od succeeds him as Emperor of Ethiopia.
 November 9 – The House of Medici is expelled from Florence. 
 November 10 – Fra Luca Pacioli's Summa de arithmetica, geometria, proportioni et proportionalità is published in Venice, containing the first printed account of algebra in the vernacular, and the first published description of the double-entry accounting system.
 November 17 – Italian War of 1494–98: The armies of Charles VIII of France enter Florence.
 December 25 – Second Battle of Acentejo: The Spanish crush the native forces of the island of Tenerife, leading to the subjugation of this last bastion of resistance in the Canary Islands.

 Date unknown 
 Aztec forces conquer and sack Mitla.
 Johann Reuchlin publishes De verbo mirifico.
 Charles VIII of France purchases the right to the Byzantine Empire from exiled pretender, Andreas Palaiologos.

Births 

 February 2 – Bona Sforza, queen of Sigismund I of Poland (d. 1557)
 February 11 – Takeda Nobutora, Japanese warlord (d. 1574)
 February 20 – Johan Friis, Danish statesman (d. 1570)
 March 24 – Georgius Agricola, German mineralogist and scholar (d. 1555)
 March 25 – Elisabeth of Brandenburg-Ansbach-Kulmbach, Margravine (d. 1518)
 April 4 – Ambrosius Moibanus, German theologian (d. 1554)
 April 20 – Johannes Agricola, German Protestant reformer (d. 1566)
 April 25 – Juan Téllez-Girón, 4th Count of Ureña, Spanish count (d. 1558)
 May 24 – Pontormo, Italian painter (d. 1557)
 August 18 – Johannes Scheubel, German mathematician (d. 1570)
 September 8 – Sri Chand, Indian founder of the ascetic sect of Udasi (d. 1629)
 September 11 – Elisabeth of Brunswick-Lüneburg, Duchess of Guelders (1518–1538) (d. 1572)
 September 12 – King Francis I of France (d. 1547)
 October 31 – Wolfgang of the Palatinate, Count Palatine of Neumarkt (1524–1558), governor of the Upper Palatinate (d. 1558)
 November 5 – Hans Sachs, German meistersinger ("mastersinger") (d. 1576)
 November 6 – Suleiman the Magnificent, Ottoman Sultan (d. 1566)
 November 12 – Margaret of Anhalt-Köthen, Princess of Anhalt by birth, Duchess consort of Saxony (d. 1521)
 November (probable) – François Rabelais, French Renaissance writer (d. 1553)
 date unknown
 Alonso Álvarez de Pineda, Spanish  explorer and cartographer (d. 1519)
 Christina Gyllenstierna, Swedish national heroine (d. 1559)
 Ambrosius Holbein, German painter (d. 1519)
 Qiu Ying, Chinese painter (d. 1552)
 Saitō Dōsan, Japanese warlord (d. 1556)
 John Sutton, 3rd Baron Dudley (d. 1554)
 Hans Tausen, Danish religious reformer (d. 1561)

Deaths 
 January 11 – Domenico Ghirlandaio, Italian artist (b. 1449)
 January 20 – Seongjong of Joseon, King of Joseon (b. 1457)
 January 25 – King Ferdinand I of Naples (b. 1423)
 May 7 – Eskender, Emperor of Ethiopia (b. 1471)
 August 1 – Giovanni Santi, Italian artist and father of Raphael (b. c. 1435)
 August 11 – Hans Memling, Flemish painter (b. c. 1430)
 September 24 – Poliziano, Italian humanist (b. 1454)
 October 21 – Gian Galeazzo Sforza, Duke of Milan (b. 1469)
 October 26 – Amda Seyon II, Emperor of Ethiopia (b. c. 1487)
 November 8 – Melozzo da Forlì, Italian painter (b. c. 1438)
 November 15 – William Calthorpe, English knight (b. 1410)
 November 16 – Theda Ukena, countess regent of East Frisia  (b. 1432)
 November 17 – Giovanni Pico della Mirandola, Italian humanist (b. 1463)
 December 19 or December 20 – Matteo Maria Boiardo, Italian poet (b. c. 1434-1441)

References